The Korg MS-20 is a patchable semi-modular monophonic analog synthesizer which Korg released in 1978 and which was in production until 1983. It was part of Korg's MS series of instruments, which also included the single oscillator MS-10, the keyboardless MS-50 module, the SQ-10 sequencer, and the VC-10 Vocoder. Additional devices included the MS-01 Foot Controller, MS-02 Interface, MS-03 Signal Processor, and MS-04 Modulation Pedal.

Although the MS-20 follows a conventional subtractive synthesis architecture of oscillators/filter/vca, its patch panel allows some rerouting of both audio and modulation, and it includes an external signal processor. This flexibility led to its resurgence during the analog revival of the late 1990s.

In 2013, Korg responded to a revived interest in monophonic analog synthesizers by reintroducing the MS-20 in a reduced-sized form, as the MS-20 Mini. Apart from being 86% of the size of the original, the use of 1/8" jacks on the patch area, and the addition of MIDI capabilities, the MS-20 Mini is otherwise functionally identical to the original.

Architecture

Audio path

Oscillators

The MS-20 has two VCOs. The output of VCO1 can be set to triangle, sawtooth, adjustable-width pulse, or white noise. The output of VCO2 can be set to sawtooth, square pulse, narrow pulse, or "ring mod".  (As with the ARP Odyssey, the "ring mod" is actually a logical exclusive-OR between the adjustable-width pulse wave output of VCO1 and the square pulse wave output of VCO2.) Although the pulse width of VCO1 is adjustable via a knob, there is no voltage control input for this parameter.  As a result, automated pulse-width modulation is not possible, although modifications to the circuitry can add this functionality. The VCOs have Hz/V voltage control inputs but note that oct/V scaling is available via judicious use of the "total" CV input socket.

Filters
There are two VCFs in series. The first is a 6 dB/oct high-pass, the second a 12 dB/oct low-pass. Resonance ("peak" in Korg parlance) is adjustable but not voltage-controlled.

Originally, the filters used Korg's proprietary KORG-35 thick film IC. Later, the filters were redesigned to use off-the-shelf LM13600 OTAs. MS-20 units fitted with LM13600 filters have a small daughter board; the front panel on such units often has a tell-tale mounting screw whose head is visible in the vicinity of the VCA block diagram. However, a report to the Analogue Heaven email list in January 2010 identified an MS-20 with the front panel screw but containing the Korg 35 filter thick film circuit rather than the expected LM13600 circuit.

A useful illustration of the Korg-35 filter in-circuit is shown online, and some photographs illustrating the later LM13600 filter daughterboard are shown  here. The tonal difference between the two is that the original Korg-35 filter has a slight amount of hiss which overdrives into the sound at high resonant settings. This causes the filter to have more of a "screaming" effect similar to it being used with a distortion pedal. The revised filter has most of this noise cleared up and is less aggressive sounding.

Output
The final component in the audio path is a VCA. It is a single-transistor design, based on a selected 2SC945 which is an NPN silicon device (equivalenced by 2N2222A according to the Towers' International Transistor Selector book, update 5 (90100)).

Modulation

Modulation generator
The MS-20 has a low frequency oscillator, labelled "modulation generator". It has two controls (rate and shape) and two outputs (pulse and sloped).

The shape control was a rather unusual feature for the time. It affects the duty cycle of the pulse output and the shape of the sloped output. When the control is at the anticlockwise end, the pulse width is very high (pulse output stays high for most of the cycle) and the sloped output is an upward sawtooth wave. At the clockwise end, the pulse width is very low (pulse output stays low for most of the cycle) and the sloped output is a downward sawtooth wave. At midway, the pulse width is 50% (pulse output is a square wave) and the sloped output is a triangle wave.

The pulse output is available through the patch panel. It is unipolar (0 or +5V) and suitable for triggering the S&H or the envelope generators.

The sloped output is bipolar (-2.5V to +2.5V). Like the pulse output, it is available through a dedicated jack on the patch panel. It also feeds the top modulation bus and so can be used to modulate the frequency of the VCOs and the cutoff frequency of either or both VCF without patching.

Envelopes
There are two envelope generators. EG1 has Delay, Attack, and Release parameters, whilst EG2 has Hold, Attack, Decay, Sustain and Release. The envelope generators have S-trig trigger inputs.

Other sources and options
The MS-20 also includes a noise source (pink and white), a separate vactrol-based modulation VCA, a wheel controller, and a trigger button. It is possible to connect the MS-20 to a step sequencer like the SQ-10 (another product by Korg). This involves making use of the CV input and the trigger input which connects straight to the SQ-10, this means that the synthesizer and the step sequencer can work in synchronisation to play the notes when the next step of the sequencers pattern is triggered. In theory it is possible to connect any analogue sequencer to the MS-20 providing it has a trigger and CV output.

External signal processor
The MS-20 includes a frequency-voltage converter, envelope follower and gate extractor which can be used to drive it with an external signal. By connecting the output of the F-V converter to the CV input of the VCOs (VCO 1+2 CV IN) and the output of the gate extractor to the trigger input of the envelope generators (TRIG IN), the operator can play the MS-20 through his/her voice or another instrument.

Instead of triggering the envelope generators, one can connect the output of the envelope follower to the main VCA's INITIAL GAIN input. In that mode of operation, the envelope generators are not used and the envelope of the MS-20's output is simply that of the external signal.

MS-20 reissues 

In January, 2013, Korg announced at NAMM that the company would release the Korg MS-20 mini. It is 86% the size of the Korg MS-20. The mini was designed by the engineers who developed the original MS-20. It aims to be a faithful re-release of the original electronic circuits of the MS-20. The MS-20 mini features 1/8-inch input and output jacks, a MIDI IN jack as well as USB MIDI (input and output).

In January, 2014, Korg announced that they would release a limited edition full-size unassembled MS-20. Like the MS-20 Mini, this kit adds MIDI and USB connectivity. The MS-20 Kit also includes both MS-20 filter revisions, selectable by the user.

In January, 2015, Korg announced at the 2015 NAMM show they would release an unassembled desktop module kit called the "MS-20M Kit". The module kit does not include a keyboard and was sold as a bundle with the Korg SQ-1 step sequencer. This version features self-oscillating high-pass/low-pass filters with distinctive distortion, toggle switches for VCO 1 to 2 sync / VCO 1 to 2 FM, a toggle to switch between rev 1 and rev 2 filter designs, PWM IN jack allows pulse width modulation, supports all CV/GATE specifications: Hz/V and V/Oct, S-Trig and V-Trig, a MIDI IN connector and USB MIDI connector, and adds a junction patching bay for integration with SQ-1.

In September 2019, Behringer announced their low-cost clone of the MS-20, the K-2.

At NAMM 2020, Korg announced a full size reissue of the MS-20, the MS-20 FS.

Software emulations
There is a software emulator of the MS-20 included in the KORG legacy Collection.  As well as a standalone emulator, the Legacy Collection provides the MS-20 as a virtual instrument (VST).  The external signal processor is implemented separately as a VST effect called MS-20EX. This same software emulated MS-20 was also part of the LAC-1 expansion for the Korg OASYS and is one of the Korg Kronos sound engines.

KORG DS-10 is a music creation program for the Nintendo DS that emulates the Korg MS range of synthesizers.

KORG DSN-12 is an MS-20 emulator for the Nintendo 3DS.

KORG iMS-20 is an MS-20 emulator for the iPad.

Notable users

 Add N to (X)
 Air
 Alec Empire
 Alphaville
 Aphex Twin
 Apoptygma Berzerk
 Arcade Fire
 Asian Dub Foundation
 Astral Projection
 Atoms for Peace
 Autechre
 BBC Radiophonic Workshop
 Beborn Beton
 Broadcast (band)
 Chicks on Speed
 Chrislo Haas
 Chvrches
 Coil
 Covenant
 The Crystal Method
 Daddy DJ
 Daft Punk
 The Dandy Warhols
 David Scott Stone
 Depeche Mode
 Der Plan
 Deutsch Amerikanische Freundschaft
 Die Krupps
 Digitalism
 Steve Hillier of Dubstar
 Edgar Froese
 Einstürzende Neubauten
 Electrosexual
 Eliot Lipp
 Erasure
 Ernest Blackwell
 Felix Kubin
 Fad Gadget
 The Faint
 The Fall
 A Flock of Seagulls
 Foals
 Fortran 5
 Friendly Fires
 Eloy Fritsch
 Front 242
 Front Line Assembly
 Futurians
 Gaudi
 Greg Anderson
 Goldfrapp
 Gorillaz
 Susumu Hirasawa
 Indochine
 Information Society
 Jon Hopkins
 Juno Reactor
 Justice
 Kas Product
 Kevin Schmidt
 Kid606
 KMFDM
 Klaxons
 Kurt Dahlke
 Ladytron
 Laibach
 Legowelt
 Liaisons Dangereuses
 Mr. Oizo
 MSTRKRFT
 Neon Indian
 Orchestral Manoeuvres in the Dark
 The Presets
 The Prodigy
 Portishead
 Robert Görl
 Röyksopp
 Scooter
 Severed Heads
 Shapeshifter
 Simeone
 Simian Mobile Disco
 Simon Posford
 Skinny Puppy
 Skyphone
 Snap!
 Snarky Puppy
 Soulwax
 Spleen United
 Stephen O'Malley
 Robert Görl
3hands4milo
 The Operator
 Trentemøller
 Ufomammut
 Villa Rosa
 Vince Clarke
 William Orbit
 Wumpscut
 Yann Tiersen
 Yuksek

References

Further reading

External links
Korg Kornucopia - Korg analogue synthesizer information, manuals and resources
More Korg info
Vintage Synth Explorer Korg MS-20 page
Korg MS-20 instruction videos

M
Analog synthesizers
Monophonic synthesizers
Musical instruments invented in the 1970s